Samir Al Wahaj (born September 1, 1979) is a Libyan footballer, currently playing for Ahly Benghazi in the Libyan Premier League

Career

Samir is somewhat of a journeyman striker. He started his career at Ghawt Al Sha'al, before moving to Al Madina, where he won the Libyan Premier League in 2001.

He then moved to Wefaq Sabratha, where he spent just over a year before he transferred to Al Urouba in July 2004.

He won the Libyan Second Division with the club - season 2004-05 - and moved back to Tripoli to play for Al Wahda. He top scored in the Libyan Premier League for the 2005-06 season when he scored 18 goals.

After interest from other clubs, he then moved to Akhdar prior to the 2006-07 season. In January 2007, he moved to Al Olympic after few chances in the Al Akhdar first team.

He was loaned out to Al Urouba for the 2007-08 season, and was loaned out to Al Tersana for the 2008-09 season. He claimed the Libyan Golden Boot, scoring 19 goals, as well as firing two goals in the 2009 Libyan Cup Final.

Ahly Benghazi signed him upon his return to Akhdar.

He has also played for Al Dhahra.

References

1979 births
Living people
Libyan footballers
Al-Madina SC players
Al-Ahly SC (Benghazi) players
Association football forwards
Olympic Azzaweya SC players
Libyan Premier League players